Polissya Zhytomyr  is a Ukrainian football club based in Zhytomyr, Polissya. As of the 2020–21 season, it will play in the Ukrainian First League, the second tier of Ukrainian football, following promotion from the 2019–20 Ukrainian Second League. Their home were Spartak and Kolos stadiums. Since being admitted to the Ukrainian Second League, the club's current stadiums do not qualify for the competition. While the city's main arena under reconstruction, the club is forced to look for an alternative.

Brief history
In Soviet times the club carried the name Avtomobilist (car maker), then it changed to Polissya (the name for the local region, which means (roughly) the wooded area). In the Ukrainian soccer competitions the club was called Khimik (chemical scientist) for a few seasons, then again changed back to Polissya. Note that during the Soviet times sometime in the 1970s in Zhytomyr there was another club FC Khimik Zhytomyr that was sponsored by the local chemical factory, the latter fate of which is not known. The same factory has supported Polissya already in times of the independent Ukraine for few seasons giving the club the name of its own former football representative, which already was mentioned before.

After the disastrous season of 2005, it became defunct. However soon after the reorganization two clubs were created and were admitted to the Second League for the 2005/06 season – MFK Zhytomyr and FC Zhytychi Zhytomyr. In March 2006, the municipal administration stopped funding of MFK Zhytomyr and the team was dissolved on 30 April 2006. FC Zhytychi Zhytomyr finished 8th in the Second League'06, but next year they failed to submit their license and stopped their participation on the professional level.

The highest position the club achieved was fourth place in the Persha Liha, twice. Because of this, in 2002 it was awarded to play a play-off match with PFC Olexandria in Kyiv to receive the promotion to the Vyscha Liha. Polissya lost it 0:1.  Subsequent seasons have brought progressively worse results with every year.

In 2005 an attempt to create the municipal club took place on initiative of Hennadiy Zabrodsky soon after the dissolution of FC Polissya Zhytomyr. At that time facing a danger of losing professional football team, Zhytomyr paradoxically witnessed creation of two teams in the place of one. The new club was created in place of the existing amateur FC Arsenal Zhytomyr. The creation of the city club was supported by the city's government as part of local elections, which, however, after the city mayor lost, the club, after playing first half of the season, was dissolved. Some players moved to the regional club OFC Zhytychi Zhytomyr.

Current rendition (since 2016) 
In November 2015 FC Polissia Zhytomyr applied for the 2016–17 Ukrainian Second League. On 23 March 2016 the deputy mayor of Zhytomyr Matviy Khrenovu announced in his Facebook that new director of MFC Zhytomyr became a head of Zhytomyr Rayon Football Federation Ruslan Pavlyuk.

In March 2017, the club was renamed into FC Polissya Zhytomyr. The club also adopted a new logo with 1959 year of establishment thus claiming heritage of the original FC Polissya Zhytomyr.

Since mid of 2021, the club began to be financed by the BGV Group which controls a network of ATB-Market retail stores.

Stadium

MFC Zhytomyr started to play at Tsentralnyi Stadion (Central Stadium), however soon at the stadium started renovations and the club moved to smaller Kolos Stadion.

In 2017, the club temporarily moved to Korosten to play at the local Spartak Stadion which was approved by the Football Federation of Ukraine and Professional Football League.

In March 2021, Polissya returned to Tsentralnyi Stadion after 16 years of reconstruction.

Players

First team squad

Managers

  Andriy Biba (1980)
  Andriy Biba (1995 – 1996)
  Anatoliy Zayayev (2000)
  Ihor Levytskyi (July 2016 – 12 Aug 2017) 
  Eduard Khavrov (28 August 2017 – 20 November 2017)
  Volodymyr Mazyar (22 November 2017 – 15 December 2017)
  Oleksandr Pryzetko (27 December 2017 – 21 August 2018)
  Anatoliy Bezsmertnyi (21 August 2018 – 4 July 2020)
  Serhiy Shyshchenko (6 July 2020 – 15 June 2021)
  Yuriy Kalitvintsev (15 June 2021 – present)

Chairmen
 Ruslan Pavlyuk, 2016–2017 
 Vitaliy Lyaskovskyi, 2017–present

League and cup history

Spartak Zhytomyr (1987–1988)
{|class="wikitable"
|-bgcolor="#efefef"
! Season
! Div.
! Pos.
! Pl.
! W
! D
! L
! GS
! GA
! P
!Domestic Cup
!colspan=2|Europe
!Notes
|-
|align=center|1987
|align=center|3rd
|align=center|12
|align=center|52
|align=center|22
|align=center|12
|align=center|18
|align=center|72
|align=center|59
|align=center|56
|align=center|
|align=center|
|align=center|
|align=center|
|-
|align=center|1988
|align=center|3rd
|align=center|13
|align=center|50
|align=center|18
|align=center|15
|align=center|17
|align=center|55
|align=center|58
|align=center|51
|align=center|
|align=center|
|align=center|
|align=center|
|}

Polissya Zhytomyr (1989–1992)
{|class="wikitable"
|-bgcolor="#efefef"
! Season
! Div.
! Pos.
! Pl.
! W
! D
! L
! GS
! GA
! P
!Domestic Cup
!colspan=2|Europe
!Notes
|-
|align=center|1989
|align=center|3rd
|align=center|15
|align=center|52
|align=center|16
|align=center|16
|align=center|20
|align=center|59
|align=center|62
|align=center|48
|align=center|
|align=center|
|align=center|
|align=center bgcolor=red|Relegated
|-
|align=center|1990
|align=center|4th Zone 1
|align=center|4
|align=center|50
|align=center|28
|align=center|13
|align=center|9
|align=center|67
|align=center|38
|align=center|69
|align=center|
|align=center|
|align=center|
|align=center|
|-
|align=center|1991
|align=center|4th Zone 1
|align=center|10
|align=center|50
|align=center|22
|align=center|7
|align=center|21
|align=center|64
|align=center|66
|align=center|51
|align=center|
|align=center|
|align=center|
|align=center bgcolor=green| fall of the Soviet Union
|-
|align=center|1992
|align=center|2nd Gr. "A"
|align=center|10
|align=center|26
|align=center|10
|align=center|5
|align=center|11
|align=center|30
|align=center|31
|align=center|25
|align=center|
|align=center|
|align=center|
|align=center bgcolor=red| Relegated
|}

Khimik Zhytomyr (1992–1997)

{|class="wikitable"
|-bgcolor="#efefef"
! Season
! Div.
! Pos.
! Pl.
! W
! D
! L
! GS
! GA
! P
!Domestic Cup
!colspan=2|Europe
!Notes
|-
|align=center|1992–93
|align=center|3rd
|align=center|2
|align=center|34
|align=center|20
|align=center|9
|align=center|5
|align=center|53
|align=center|29
|align=center|49
|align=center|
|align=center|
|align=center|
|align=center bgcolor=green|Promoted
|-
|align=center|1993–94
|align=center|2nd
|align=center|10
|align=center|38
|align=center|14
|align=center|8
|align=center|16
|align=center|39
|align=center|47
|align=center|36
|align=center|
|align=center|
|align=center|
|align=center|
|-
|align=center|1994–95
|align=center|2nd
|align=center|4
|align=center|42
|align=center|20
|align=center|15
|align=center|7
|align=center|61
|align=center|37
|align=center|75
|align=center|
|align=center|
|align=center|
|align=center|
|-
|align=center|1995–96
|align=center|2nd
|align=center|14
|align=center|42
|align=center|16
|align=center|10
|align=center|16
|align=center|55
|align=center|57
|align=center|58
|align=center|
|align=center|
|align=center|
|align=center|
|-
|align=center|1996–97
|align=center|2nd
|align=center|18
|align=center|46
|align=center|15
|align=center|10
|align=center|21
|align=center|44
|align=center|61
|align=center|55
|align=center|
|align=center|
|align=center|
|align=center|
|}

Polissya Zhytomyr (1997–2005)
{|class="wikitable"
|-bgcolor="#efefef"
! Season
! Div.
! Pos.
! Pl.
! W
! D
! L
! GS
! GA
! P
!Domestic Cup
!colspan=2|Europe
!Notes
|-
|align=center|1997–98
|align=center|2nd
|align=center|6
|align=center|42
|align=center|21
|align=center|5
|align=center|16
|align=center|58
|align=center|64
|align=center|68
|align=center|
|align=center|
|align=center|
|align=center|
|-
|align=center|1998–99
|align=center|2nd
|align=center|12
|align=center|38
|align=center|15
|align=center|7
|align=center|16
|align=center|40
|align=center|55
|align=center|52
|align=center|
|align=center|
|align=center|
|align=center|
|-
|align=center|1999–00
|align=center|2nd
|align=center|15
|align=center|34
|align=center|11
|align=center|7
|align=center|16
|align=center|36
|align=center|51
|align=center|40
|align=center|
|align=center|
|align=center|
|align=center bgcolor=red| Relegated
|-
|align=center|2000–01
|align=center|3rd
|align=center|1
|align=center|30
|align=center|22
|align=center|4
|align=center|4
|align=center|61
|align=center|17
|align=center|70
|align=center|
|align=center|
|align=center|
|align=center bgcolor=green| Promoted
|-
|align=center|2001–02
|align=center|2nd
|align=center|4
|align=center|34
|align=center|17
|align=center|10
|align=center|7
|align=center|43
|align=center|33
|align=center|58
|align=center|
|align=center|
|align=center|
|align=center|Lost promotion play-offs
|-
|align=center|2002–03
|align=center|2nd
|align=center|11
|align=center|34
|align=center|12
|align=center|7
|align=center|15
|align=center|30
|align=center|38
|align=center|43
|align=center|
|align=center|
|align=center|
|align=center|
|-
|align=center|2003–04
|align=center|2nd
|align=center|18
|align=center|34
|align=center|3
|align=center|7
|align=center|24
|align=center|22
|align=center|67
|align=center|16
|align=center|
|align=center|
|align=center|
|align=center|Avoided relegation
|-
|align=center|2004–05
|align=center|2nd
|align=center|18
|align=center|34
|align=center|0
|align=center|2
|align=center|32
|align=center|5
|align=center|39
|align=center|2
|align=center|
|align=center|
|align=center|
|align=center bgcolor=red|withdrew Relegated
|}

Zhytychi Zhytomyr (2005–2006)
{|class="wikitable"
|-bgcolor="#efefef"
! Season
! Div.
! Pos.
! Pl.
! W
! D
! L
! GS
! GA
! P
!Domestic Cup
!colspan=2|Europe
!Notes
|-
|align=center|2005–06
|align=center|3rd
|align=center|8
|align=center|28
|align=center|10
|align=center|11
|align=center|7
|align=center|38
|align=center|34
|align=center|41
|align=center|
|align=center|
|align=center|
|align=center|withdrew
|}

MFC Polissya Zhytomyr (since 2016)
{|class="wikitable"
|- style="background:#efefef;"
! Season
! Div.
! Pos.
! Pl.
! W
! D
! L
! GS
! GA
! P
!Domestic Cup
!colspan=2|Other
!Notes
|-bgcolor=#6798c1
| align="center"|2016
| align="center" rowspan=3|4th(Amateur Championship)
| align="center"|3
| align="center"|6
| align="center"|3
| align="center"|1
| align="center"|2
| align="center"|6
| align="center"|5
| align="center"|10
| align="center"|
| align="center"|
| align="center"|
| align="center"|Group 1
|-bgcolor=#6798c1
| align="center" rowspan=2|2016–17
| align="center" rowspan=2|6
| align="center" rowspan=2|20
| align="center" rowspan=2|7
| align="center" rowspan=2|5
| align="center" rowspan=2|8
| align="center" rowspan=2|13
| align="center" rowspan=2|18
| align="center" rowspan=2|26
| align="center" rowspan=2|
| align="center" rowspan=2|UAC
| align="center" rowspan=2| finals
| align="center" |Group 2
|-bgcolor=SteelBlue
| align="center" bgcolor=lightgreen|Admitted to SL
|-bgcolor=PowderBlue
|align=center|2017–18
|align=center rowspan=3|3rd "A"
|align=center|8
|align=center|27	
|align=center|9 	
|align=center|3		
|align=center|15
|align=center|31 	 	
|align=center|44
|align=center|30
| align="center" | finals
|align=center|
|align=center|
|align=center|
|-bgcolor=PowderBlue
|align=center|2018–19
|align=center bgcolor=tan|3
|align=center|27
|align=center|13
|align=center|6
|align=center|8
|align=center|23
|align=center|21
|align=center|45
| align="center" | finals
|align=center|
|align=center|
|align=center|
|-bgcolor=PowderBlue
| align="center" |2019–20
| align="center" bgcolor=silver|2
| align="center" |20
| align="center" |11
| align="center" |6
| align="center" |3
| align="center" |28
| align="center" |11
| align="center" |39
| align="center" | finals
| align="center" |
| align="center" |
| align="center" bgcolor=lightgreen|Promoted
|-bgcolor=LightCyan
| align="center" |2020–21
| align="center" |2nd
| align="center" |11
| align="center" |30  
| align="center" |9  
| align="center" |8 
| align="center" |13  
| align="center" |32 
| align="center" |37 
| align="center" |35
| align="center" | finals
| align="center" |
| align="center" |
| align="center" |
|}

Awards
 Championship of the Ukrainian SSR
Winners (1): 1967
Runners up (2): 1973, 1975
 Cup of the Ukrainian SSR (2)
Winners (2): 1972, 1990
Runners up (1): 1974

FC Polissya-2 Zhytomyr
It is a team of the Specialized sports school of Olympic Reserve Polissya.
{|class="wikitable"
|-bgcolor="#efefef"
! Season
! Div.
! Pos.
! Pl.
! W
! D
! L
! GS
! GA
! P
!Domestic Cup
!colspan=2|Europe
!Notes
|-
|align=center|2008
|align=center|4th
|align=center|2
|align=center|8
|align=center|5
|align=center|0
|align=center|3
|align=center|11
|align=center|9
|align=center|15
|align=center|
|align=center|
|align=center|
|align=center|
|}

References

External links
 Ukrainian Records
 Soviet Records
 Football club FC Polissya. Zhytomyr City Journal. 10 July 2009
 Official website
 Buha, Bohdan. How the Cup was stripped away from the Cup's Masters (ЯК ЗАБРАЛИ КУБОК У «КУБКОВОГО БІЙЦЯ»). uaf.ua. 11 January 2012
 Reshnyuk, M. "Our instance is the mayor's initiative". Prof-football is returning to Zhytomyr ("Наш случай - это инициатива мэра". В Житомир возвращается проффутбол). UA-Football. 8 July 2017
 Maksim Maksimov. The chronological row of current events or Who will return the Big Football to Zhytomir? (Хроника текущих событий, или Кто вернет в Житомир Большой футбол?). UA-Football. 4 April 2012.

 
Football clubs in Zhytomyr
Association football clubs established in 1959
1959 establishments in Ukraine
Avanhard (sports society)
Spartak Voluntary Sports Society
Ukrainian First League clubs
Sport in Korosten
Phoenix clubs (association football)